Mozilla Firefox 3.0 is a version of the Firefox web browser released on June 17, 2008, by the Mozilla Corporation.

Firefox 3.0 uses version 1.9 of the Gecko layout engine for displaying web pages. This version fixes many bugs, improves standards compliance, and implements many new web APIs compared to Firefox 2.0. Other new features include a redesigned download manager, a new "Places" system for storing bookmarks and history, and separate themes for different operating systems.

Firefox 3.0 had over 8 million unique downloads the day it was released, and by July 2008 held over 5.6% of the recorded usage share of web browsers. Estimates of Firefox 3.0's global market share  were generally in the range of 4–5%, and then dropped as users migrated to Firefox 3.5 and later Firefox 3.6.
Partially as a result of this, between mid-December 2009 and the end of January 2010, Firefox 3.5 was the most popular browser (when counting individual browser versions), passing Internet Explorer 7.

Mozilla ended support for Firefox 3 on March 30, 2010, with the release of 3.0.19.

Development 

Firefox 3.0 was developed under the codename Gran Paradiso. This, like other Firefox codenames, is the name of an actual place; in this case the seventh-highest mountain in the Graian Alps where they first came up with the idea.

Planning began in October 2006, when the development team asked users to submit feature requests that they wished to be included in Firefox 3.

The Mozilla Foundation released the first beta on November 19, 2007, the second beta on December 18, 2007, the third beta on February 12, 2008, the fourth beta on March 10, 2008, and the fifth and final beta on April 2, 2008. The first release candidate was announced on May 16, 2008, followed by a second release candidate on June 4, 2008, and a third (differing from the second release candidate only in that it corrected a serious bug for Mac users) on June 11, 2008. Mozilla shipped the final release on June 17, 2008.

On its release date, Firefox 3 was featured in popular culture, mentioned on The Colbert Report, among others.

Changes and features

Backend changes 
One of the big changes in Firefox 3 is the implementation of Gecko 1.9, an updated layout engine. The new version fixes many bugs, improves standard compliance, and implements new web APIs. In particular, it makes Firefox 3 the first official release of a Mozilla browser to pass the Acid2 test, a standards-compliance test for web-page rendering. It also receives a better score on the Acid3 test than Firefox 2.

Some of the new features are defined in the WHATWG HTML 5 specification, such as support for web-based protocol handlers, a native implementation of the getElementsByClassName method, support for safe message-passing with postMessage, and support for offline web applications. Other new features include APNG support, and EXSLT support.

A new internal memory allocator, jemalloc, is used rather than the default libc one.

Gecko 1.9 uses Cairo as a graphics backend, allowing for improved graphics performance and better consistency of the look and feel on various operating systems. Because of Cairo's lack of support for Windows 95, Windows 98, Windows ME, and Windows NT (versions 4.0 and below), and because Microsoft ended support for Windows 98 and Windows ME on July 11, 2006, Firefox 3 does not run on those operating systems. Similarly, the Mac version of Firefox 3 runs only on Mac OS X 10.4 or higher, but, unlike previous versions, has a native Cocoa widget interface.

Frontend changes 

As for the frontend changes, Firefox features a redesigned download manager with built-in search and the ability to resume downloads. Also, a new plug-in manager is included in the add-ons window and extensions can be installed with a package manager. Microformats are supported for use by software that can understand their use in documents to store data in a machine-readable form.

The password manager in Firefox 3 asks the user if they would like it to remember the password after the login attempt rather than before. By doing this users are able to avoid storing an incorrect password in the password manager after a bad login attempt.

Firefox 3 uses a "Places" system for storing bookmarks and history in an SQLite backend. The new system stores more information about the user's history and bookmarks, in particular letting the user tag the pages. It is also used to implement an improved frecency-based algorithm for the new location bar auto-complete feature (dubbed the "Awesomebar").

The Mac version of Firefox 3 supports Growl notifications, the Mac OS X spell checker, and Aqua-style form controls.

Themes 
To give the browser a more native look and feel on different operating systems, Firefox 3 uses separate themes for Mac OS X, Linux, Windows XP, and Windows Vista. When running on GNOME, Firefox 3 displays icons from the environment; thus, when the desktop environment icon theme changes, Firefox follows suit. Additional icons were also made to be used when no appropriate icon exists; these were made following the Tango Desktop Project guidelines. Additionally, the GTK version has replaced the non-native tab bar that was implemented in Firefox 2.0 and instead uses the native GTK+ tab style.

The default icons and icon layout for Firefox 3 also changed dramatically, taking on a keyhole shape for the forward and back buttons by default on two of the three platforms. However, the keyhole shape does not take effect in Linux or in the small-icon mode. The Iconfactory created the icons for the Microsoft Windows platform. In addition, separate icons sets are displayed for Windows XP and Vista.

Breakpad 

Breakpad (previously called "Airbag") is an open-source crash reporter utility which replaced the proprietary Talkback. It has been developed by Google and Mozilla, and used in Firefox and Thunderbird. This product is significant because it is the first open-source multi-platform crash reporting system.

During development, Breakpad was first included May 27, 2007 in Firefox 3 trunk builds on Windows NT, Mac OS X, and, weeks later, on Linux. Breakpad replaced Talkback (also known as the Quality Feedback Agent) as the crash reporter used by the Mozilla software to report crashes of its products to a centralized server for aggregation or case-by-case analysis. Talkback was proprietary software licensed to the Mozilla Corporation by SupportSoft.

Usage 

Net Applications noted that the use of Firefox 3 beta rapidly increased to a usage share of 0.62% in May 2008. They interpreted this increase to mean that Firefox 3 betas were stable and that users were using it as their primary browser. Within 24 hours after the release of Firefox 3.0, usage rose from under 1% to over 3% according to Net Applications. It reached a peak of 21.17% in April 2009 before declining as users switched to Firefox 3.5 and later Firefox 3.6.

Guinness World Record 

The official date for the launch of Firefox 3 was June 17, 2008, named "Download Day 2008". Firefox was aiming to set the record for most software downloads in 24 hours.

Download Day officially started at 11:16 a.m. PDT (18:16 UTC) on June 17. With the announced date, the download day was June 18 for time zones greater than GMT +6, which includes half of Asia and all of Oceania.

The large number of users attempting to access the Mozilla website on June 17 caused it to become unavailable for at least a few hours, and attempts at upgrading to the new version resulted in server timeouts. The site was not updated for the download of Firefox 3 until 12:00 PDT (19:00 UTC), two hours later than originally scheduled.

When "Download Day" ended at 11:16 AM PDT (18:16 UTC) June 18, 8,249,092 unique downloads had been recorded. On July 2 Mozilla announced they had won the record, with 8,002,530 unique downloads and parties in over 25 countries.
As of July 7, 2008, more than 31 million people had downloaded Firefox 3.

Gareth Deaves, Records Manager for Guinness World Records, complimented Mozilla, saying, "Mobilizing over 8 million internet users within 24 hours is an extremely impressive accomplishment and we would like to congratulate the Mozilla community for their hard work and dedication."

Operating System support
Firefox 3 runs on Windows 2000 and later, and on Windows 98 and ME with the third-party Kernel Extender installed.

Critical response 
While the new functionality of the location bar, dubbed the "Awesomebar", was overall well-received, there were those who did not like it due to user interface and performance changes, so much that extensions were made to revert it. Firefox 3 received CNET Editors' Choice in June 2008.

See also
 Firefox early version history

References

External links 
 Mozilla Firefox homepage for end-users
 Mozilla Firefox project page for developers
 Mozilla EULA
 
 
 Review of Firefox in PC Magazine

3
2008 software
Free software programmed in C++
Gopher clients
History of web browsers
Linux web browsers
MacOS web browsers
POSIX web browsers
Unix Internet software
Windows web browsers
Software that uses XUL